The Province of Prussia was a province of Prussia from 1829 to 1878. Prussia was established as a province of the Kingdom of Prussia in 1829 from the provinces of East Prussia and West Prussia, and was dissolved in 1878 when the merger was reversed.

Königsberg (present-day Kaliningrad, Russia) was the provincial capital.

History
Ducal Prussia became part of Brandenburg-Prussia in 1618, and became the Kingdom of Prussia upon Frederick I of Prussia's coronation as king in 1701. After the coronation, the term "Province of Prussia" was used to designate East Prussia to differentiate the former duchy's territory within the larger kingdom. Royal Prussia (consisting of the Malbork Land and Warmia which were parts of historical Prussia, but also of historically Polish Pomerelia) was annexed by the Kingdom of Prussia from the Polish–Lithuanian Commonwealth in 1772 during the First Partition of Poland, placing them under Prussian rule under the name West Prussia, with the exception of Warmia integrated into East Prussia. 

The Province of Prussia was created on April 13, 1824, as the easternmost province of the Kingdom of Prussia. The province was formed in a merger with the pre-existing provinces of East Prussia and West Prussia joined together in a personal union, and from December 3, 1829, in a real union. Its territory included the entire historical region of Prussia, from which the province and the kingdom derived their names, as well as Pomerelia and (following the Congress of Vienna) parts of Greater Poland. On April 1, 1878, the Province of Prussia was divided back into the provinces of West Prussia and East Prussia.

Prussia
Kingdom of Prussia
1829 establishments in Prussia
1878 disestablishments in Prussia
States and territories established in 1829
States and territories disestablished in 1878
Duchy of Prussia